Stinesville is a town in Bean Blossom Township, Monroe County, in the U.S. state of Indiana. The population was 198 at the 2010 census. It is part of the Bloomington, Indiana Metropolitan Statistical Area.

History
Stinesville was platted in 1855 when the New Albany and Salem Railroad was extended to that point. The town was named for Eusebius Stine, the original owner of the town site. A post office has been in operation at Stinesville since 1860.

Stinesville Commercial Historic District was listed on the National Register of Historic Places in 1995.

Geography
Stinesville is located at  (39.299245, -86.650075), approximately 5 miles north of Ellettsville.

Demographics

As of the 2000 census,there were 194 people, 67 households, and 48 families residing in the town. The racial makeup of the town was 95.88% White, 2.58% Asian, and 1.55% from two or more races.

There were 67 households, out of which 32.8% had children under the age of 18 living with them, 55.2% were married couples living together, 11.9% had a female householder with no husband present, and 26.9% were non-families. 25.4% of all households were made up of individuals, and 16.4% had someone living alone who was 65 years of age or older. The average household size was 2.90 and the average family size was 3.35.

In the town, the population was spread out, with 30.9% under the age of 18, 6.2% from 18 to 24, 29.9% from 25 to 44, 22.7% from 45 to 64, and 10.3% who were 65 years of age or older. The median age was 36 years. For every 100 females, there were 96.0 males. For every 100 females age 18 and over, there were 91.4 males.

The median income for a household in the town was $31,875, and the median income for a family was $36,875. Males had a median income of $26,667 versus $15,000 for females. The per capita income for the town was $11,411. None of the families and 1.0% of the population were living below the poverty line, including no under eighteens and 7.4% of those over 64.

References

Towns in Monroe County, Indiana
Towns in Indiana
Bloomington metropolitan area, Indiana